The Sanremo Music Festival 1967 was the 17th annual Sanremo Music Festival, held at the Sanremo Casino in Sanremo, province of Imperia between 26 and 28 January 1967.

The show was presented by Mike Bongiorno and Renata Mauro.
  
According to the rules of this edition, every song was performed in a double performance by a couple of singers or groups. The winners of the Festival were Iva Zanicchi and Claudio Villa with the song "Non pensare a me". Following the festival, the biggest success and most popular song was "Cuore matto" (crazy heart) of Little Tony, which sold 6 million copies and was the no.1 hit for nine consecutive weeks in the Italian hit parade. During the festival, following the elimination of their song, the partner of Dalida singer-songwriter Luigi Tenco committed suicide.

Shortly after the contest ended, the original tape of the contest was lost. It would be four decades before a copy would be recovered and restored by Italian broadcaster RAI.

Participants and results

References 

Sanremo Music Festival by year
1967 in Italian music
1967 music festivals